Ngāti Hine is an iwi with a rohe in Northland, New Zealand. It is part of the wider Ngāpuhi iwi.

Its rohe (tribal area) covers the areas of Waiomio, Kawakawa, Taumarere, Moerewa, Ruapekapeka, Motatau, Waimahae, Towai, Akeramaa, Pakaraka, Otiria, Pipiwai, Kaikou and Te Horo.

History

Ngāti Hine is descended from a female ancestor, Hineamaru, a great granddaughter of Rāhiri who settled in the Waiomio Valley, near Kawakawa. The prominent leader in the early years of European contact was Te Ruki Kawiti (1770s–1854).

Ngāti Hine sought to withdraw from Te Runanga-a-Iwi o Ngapuhi charitable trust in 2010, without withdrawing from Ngāpuhi.

Hapū and marae

Marae

The marae (communal places) of Ngāti Hine include:

Horomanga marae in Moerewa
Kaikou marae and Eparaima Makapi meeting house in Matawaia
Kawiti marae and Te Tawai Riri Maihi Kawiti meeting house in Waiomio
Matawaia marae and Rangimarie	meeting house in Matawaia
Maungārongo marae and Maungārongo meeting house in Moerewa
Miria marae and Te Rapunga meeting house in Waiomio
Mohinui marae and Hohourongo meeting house in Waiomio
Mōtatau marae and Manu Koroki	meeting house in Mōtatau
Ōtiria marae and Tūmatauenga meeting house in Ōtiria
Parakao marae and Te Aroha meeting house in Parakao
Tau Henare marae in Pīpīwai
Te Rito marae in Kawiti
Tere Awatea maare in Orauta
Matawaia o rangimarie me te Miria te whare kai

Hapū
The hapū (sub-tribes) of the Ngāti Hine rohe (tribal area) include:

Ngāti Kahu o Torongare, based at Mohinui marae and Hohourongo meeting house in Waiomio
Ngāti Kōpaki, based at Ōtiria marae and Tūmatauenga meeting house in Ōtiria
Ngāti Ngāherehere, based at Matawaia marae and Rangimarie	meeting house in Matawaia
Ngāti Te Ara, based at Ōtiria marae and Tūmatauenga meeting house in Ōtiria
Ngāti Te Tārawa, based at Mōtatau marae and Manu Koroki meeting house in Mōtatau
Te Kau i Mua, based at Matawaia marae and Rangimarie meeting house in Matawaia
Te Orewai, based at Tau Henare marae in Pīpīwai

Governance

Te Rūnanga o Ngāti Hine represents the iwi in resource consent consultation under the Resource Management Act, but that does not imply formal Crown recognition of the iwi, or the trust's authority to act on behalf of the iwi. Under the Māori Fisheries Act, if Ngāti Hine correctly withdraws from the joint mandated iwi organisation of Ngāpuhi, it will also be recognised as an iwi under that Act. The charitable trust is governed by a tribal parliament, Te Mara a Hineamaru, which is made up of three representatives from 13 marae and based in Kawakawa.

The rohe (tribal area) of Ngāti Hine covers the territory of Whangarei District Council, Far North District Council and Northland Regional Council.

Media

Notable people

 Arapeta Awatere, soldier and politician
 Ria Bond
 Ken Going, All Black
 Pearl Going, mountaineer
 Sid Going, All Black
 George Henare, actor
 Taurekareka Henare, politician
 Hōne Heke, tribal leader
 Donna Awatere Huata, politician and Maori rights activist.
 Kirihi Te Riri Maihi Kawiti, tribal leader.
 Maihi Paraone Kawiti, tribal leader
 Te Ruki Kawiti, prominent rangatira (chief). He and Hōne Heke successfully fought the British in the Flagstaff War in 1845–46.
 Todd Miller (rugby union), from the Going family
 Veeshayne Patuwai, TV presenter & actress.
 Lisa Reihana, artist.
 Shane Reti, politician
 Leilani Rorani, squash player
 Tau Henare, Politician
 James Henare, KBE, DSO, Maori leader
 Peeni Henare, Politician
 Willow-Jean Prime, Politician

References

External links
Ngati Hine Forestry Trust

 
Iwi and hapū